The Rembrandt was an express train that linked Amsterdam in the Netherlands, with Munich in Germany and later Chur in Switzerland. The train was named after the renowned Dutch painter Rembrandt.  For its first 16 years it was a first-class-only Trans Europ Express, becoming a two-class InterCity in 1983 and finally a EuroCity in 1987.

History

Trans Europ Express
With the completion of the electrification works at the Dutch–German border on the Arnhem–Oberhausen line, the Rembrandt was launched on 28 May 1967. Of the then-three TEE services on that line, the Rembrandt was scheduled as the afternoon service from Amsterdam, between the Rheingold in the morning and the Rhein-Main in the evening. The Rembrandt conveyed through coaches for the TEE Helvetia that were exchanged in Mannheim, thus providing an afternoon TEE service between Amsterdam and Zürich via the Rhine Valley, alongside the TEE Edelweiss which departed from Amsterdam in the morning and was routed via Brussels and Luxembourg en route to Zurich.  It carried a dining car staffed by the German Sleeper and Dining Car Company (DSG).

The Rembrandt was the first TEE to call in Baden-Wurtemberg's capital, Stuttgart. Northbound, the Rembrandt departed for Amsterdam from Munich early in the morning, thus providing a morning service complementing the existing afternoon TEE service provided by the Rheinpfeil. On 27 May 1979, the exchange of coaches with the Helvetia was discontinued, and the stop at Mannheim was replaced by a stop at Darmstadt. On 1 June 1980, the route was shortened to Stuttgart at the southern end.

The Rembrandts last day of operation as a TEE was 28 May 1983. The following day, its southern terminus was moved farther north, to Frankfurt am Main, and the train was converted to a two-class InterCity service.  It continued to carry a full dining car.  Its train number was IC 122 northbound, IC 123 southbound.

EuroCity
On 31 May 1987, with the start of the EuroCity network, the EC Rembrandt replaced the TEE Rheingold, although the Swiss terminus was not Geneva but Chur. The original route of the Rembrandt was served by EC Frans Hals. When new Swiss rolling stock of type EC90  became available in 1991, the Rembrandt was formed with class EC90 coaches, including observation cars – or "panoramic" coaches – Swiss class Apm 19.  As the Rheingold had carried observation cars from 1962 until 1976, the 1991 change to the Rembrandts consist returned such cars to the train service through the Rhine Valley, although in a newer form, not the vista-dome type that the Rheingold had carried. On 14 December 2002, the Rembrandt was replaced by an ICE service between Amsterdam and Basel.

References

Works cited

External links

EuroCity
International named passenger trains
Named passenger trains of Germany
Named passenger trains of the Netherlands
Named passenger trains of Switzerland
Trans Europ Express
Railway services introduced in 1967
Railway services discontinued in 2002
Rembrandt
1967 establishments in the Netherlands
1967 establishments in Germany
1967 establishments in Switzerland
2002 disestablishments in the Netherlands
2002 disestablishments in Germany
2002 disestablishments in Switzerland